Mason Township is a township in Taylor County, Iowa, USA.

History
Mason Township is named for James Mason, a pioneer settler.

References

Townships in Taylor County, Iowa
Townships in Iowa